Yared Woldemichael (born 1 January 1968) is an Ethiopian boxer. He competed in the men's light middleweight event at the 1996 Summer Olympics.

References

External links
 

1968 births
Living people
Ethiopian male boxers
Olympic boxers of Ethiopia
Boxers at the 1996 Summer Olympics
Place of birth missing (living people)
Light-middleweight boxers